Mathias Karlsson (born 22 August 1995) is a Swedish professional ice hockey player. He is currently playing with Tranås AIF of the Hockeyettan (Div.1).

Karlsson made his Swedish Hockey League debut playing with Linköpings HC during the 2014–15 SHL season.

References

External links

1995 births
Living people
Linköping HC players
IF Sundsvall Hockey players
Swedish ice hockey centres
Sportspeople from Linköping
Sportspeople from Östergötland County